Cabin Boy is a 1994 American fantasy comedy film directed by Adam Resnick, co-produced by Tim Burton, and starring comedian Chris Elliott. Elliott co-wrote the film with Resnick. Both Elliott and Resnick worked for Late Night with David Letterman in the 1980s as well as co-creating the Fox sitcom Get a Life in the early 1990s.

Plot
Nathaniel Mayweather is a snobbish, self-centered, arrogant, virginal man. After graduation, he is invited by his father to sail to Hawaii aboard The Queen Catherine. After annoying the limousine driver who is taking him to board the boat, he is forced to walk the rest of the way.

Nathaniel makes a wrong turn into a small fishing village where he meets the imbecilic cabin boy/first mate Kenny of The Filthy Whore. Nathaniel believes The Filthy Whore to be The Queen Catherine until the next morning, when Captain Greybar finds Nathaniel in his room and explains that the boat will not return to dry land for three months. Nathaniel unsuccessfully tries to convince each fisherman to set sail to Hawaii, but convinces Kenny into doing so. However, the crew reaches Hell's Bucket, a Bermuda Triangle-like area where strange events occur. The ship is caught in a fierce storm and Kenny is knocked overboard and drowns. With only one island in the entire area, the crew decide to set sail there. Without a cabin boy, Greybar forces Nathaniel to do the chores in return for taking him to Hawaii, as well as teaching him how to become a better person.

After failing all the chores he is assigned, the fishermen decide to give Nathaniel another chore that involves dragging him on a floating raft for a week. Nathaniel quickly runs out of supplies, begins consuming salt water, and suffers extreme sunburn after confusing cooking oil as lotion. He also realizes he might be going insane after sighting Kenny's ghost and seeing a floating cupcake that spits tobacco. After falling into the water he is saved by a shark-man. After nine days, Nathaniel is pulled back in and tells what happened. It is revealed by Skunk and Big Teddy that the shark-man is known as Chocki, the offspring of a male viking and female shark.

Nathaniel spots a beautiful young woman named Trina swimming in the ocean. After she is pulled up in a net, Nathaniel becomes smitten with her. Not pleased with another passenger on board, the fishermen decide to strand Trina and Nathaniel on the island they're sailing toward. Finally reaching the island, the crew searches for components to fix their boat. Nathaniel tries to get closer to Trina, who constantly rejects him.

Greybar and Skunk suggest to Nathaniel that a blue-skinned, six-armed woman named Calli can help build his confidence. After an encounter with Calli that results in his first sexual experience, Nathaniel again meets Trina, who becomes attracted to him immediately. Calli's husband Mulligan, a giant, comes home to find a man's bag. Realizing what Calli has done, Mulligan decides to find her lover and kill him. Nathaniel tries to save everyone by confessing to the giant he's the one who slept with Calli. Mulligan is about to kill Nathaniel with a giant nail clipper when Chocki saves him. Nathaniel then kills Mulligan by choking him with his own belt.

Finally reaching Hawaii, Nathaniel offers his newfound companions a job at the hotel where his father is the owner, which they refuse. They tell Nathaniel he's a fancy lad who should stay in Hawaii with his dad where he belongs. Nathaniel and the fishermen part ways, including Trina. His father, William Mayweather, expresses disappointment in his son's actions. Not wanting to live the fancy-lad life, Nathaniel leaves to find Trina, and then both join the crew on The Filthy Whore.

Cast
 Chris Elliott as Nathaniel Mayweather
 Ritch Brinkley as Captain Greybar
 Brian Doyle-Murray as Skunk
 James Gammon as Pappy
 Brion James as Teddy "Big Teddy"
 Melora Walters as Trina
 Ann Magnuson as Calli
 Russ Tamblyn as Chocki
 Ricki Lake as Figurehead
 Andy Richter as Kenny
 Mike Starr as Mulligan, The Giant
 I.M. Hobson as Headmaster Timmons
 Alex Nevil as Thomas 
 David Sterry as Lance
 Bob Elliott as William Mayweather
 Edward Flotard as Limo Driver
 Jim Cummings as the Floating Cupcake (voice)
 Earl Hofert as Old Salt in Fishing Village

Production
The project was originally to be directed by Burton, who had contacted Chris Elliott after seeing Get a Life. Resnick took over after Burton was offered the film Ed Wood.

Reception
The film received mixed reviews from critics. On Rotten Tomatoes, it has a 48% rating based on reviews from 27 critics, with a weighted average of 5.2/10.

Chris Elliott earned a Razzie Award nomination for Worst New Star, but lost to Anna Nicole Smith for Naked Gun : The Final Insult. The film was nominated for Worst Picture at the 1994 Stinkers Bad Movie Awards but lost to North.

Year-end lists 
 1st worst – Bob Strauss, Los Angeles Daily News

Legacy
Hip hop producer Dan "the Automator" Nakamura named his publishing company, Sharkman Music, after the film. References to the film have appeared in multiple works by Nakamura. For example, the Bulk Recordings edition of Kool Keith's debut solo album Dr. Octagonecologyst, contains a dialogue excerpt from the film preceding the song "halfsharkalligatorhalfman"; the hook of the song, "Half Man, Half Shark", is sampled from the same dialogue.

Post-hardcore band A Static Lullaby reference the film in their song "Half Man, Half Shark; Equals One Complete Gentleman", the title of which is a paraphrase of an Elliott line spoken in the film. The song can be found on their Faso Latido album.

When interviewed by the website IMDb, actor Brett Gelman said this was the most underrated comedy of all time.

References

External links

 
 
 
 
 

1994 films
1990s fantasy comedy films
David Letterman
Touchstone Pictures films
Films produced by Tim Burton
Films produced by Denise Di Novi
Seafaring films
Films about giants
Films scored by Steve Bartek
Films set on boats
American fantasy comedy films
1994 directorial debut films
1994 comedy films
Films with screenplays by Adam Resnick
1990s English-language films
1990s American films